Patrick Yaw Boamah (born 1974) is a Ghanaian politician and member of the Seventh Parliament of the Fourth Republic of Ghana representing the Okaikwei Central Constituency in the Greater Accra Region on the ticket of the New Patriotic Party.

Early life and education
Boamah was born on 19 September 1974. He hails from Mourso-Effiduase, in the Ashanti Region of Ghana. He obtained his bachelor of laws and master's degree in International Affairs from the University of Ghana in 2004 and 2005 respectively. He later proceeded to the Ghana School of Law where he received his barrister-at-law degree in 2009.

Career
Boamah is a lawyer by profession. Before entering politics, he was an Associate at the Sam Okudzeto and Associates law firm.

Politics
Boamah entered parliament on 7 January 2013 on the ticket of the New Patriotic Party representing the Okaikwei Central  Constituency. He was re-elected in the 2016 Ghanaian general election to represent the constituency for a second consecutive term.

In parliament, he has served on various committees, some of which include; the Subsidiary Legislation Committee, the Judiciary Committee, and the Foreign Affairs Committee.

He is contesting in the 2020 Ghanaian general election as the parliamentary candidate for the New Patriotic Party.

Personal life
Boamah is married with two children. He identifies as a Christian and a member of the Methodist Church of Ghana.

References

Ghanaian MPs 2017–2021
1974 births
Living people
New Patriotic Party politicians
Ghanaian MPs 2021–2025